The 2018 Florida gubernatorial election was held on November 6, 2018, to elect the next governor of Florida, alongside an election to the United States Senate, elections to the United States House of Representatives and other state and local elections. Incumbent two-term Republican governor Rick Scott was term-limited and could not run for a third term, so he instead ran for Florida's Class I Senate seat.

Republican U.S. Representative Ron DeSantis narrowly defeated Democratic Mayor of Tallahassee Andrew Gillum for the governorship, in what some considered an upset. The candidate filing deadline was June 22, 2018, and primary elections were held on August 28. Florida uses a closed primary process, in which the selection of each party's candidates for a general election is limited to registered members of that party; Gillum won the Democratic primary and DeSantis the Republican primary.

The close margin mandated a machine recount, which had a deadline of November 15, 2018. After the recount was complete, DeSantis was certified as the winner. Gillum conceded on November 17. DeSantis's victory marked the sixth straight election in which Florida elected a Republican to the governorship, and the third in a row that the margin of victory was under two percent. With a margin of 0.4%, this election was the closest race of the 2018 gubernatorial election cycle. Gillum became the first Democrat to win Duval County since 1986 and Seminole County since 1990, while DeSantis became the first Republican gubernatorial candidate to win Jefferson County since Reconstruction.

On November 10, 2022, former president Donald Trump claimed on his Truth Social page that he had prematurely ended the recount to prevent DeSantis and Senate candidate Rick Scott from losing, under the unsubstantiated belief that ballots for them were being removed. Florida Commissioner of Agriculture Nikki Fried has asked Attorney General Merrick Garland to investigate.  Sarah Isgur, the spokeswoman of the Department of Justice from 2017 to 2019, has said that it "never happened," a position which was supported by other former Department of Justice officials. Broward County Commissioner Steven Geller has agreed that no interference took place.

Republican primary

Nominee

 Ron DeSantis, U.S. representative

Eliminated in primary

 Don Baldauf, contractor
 Timothy Devine, candidate for governor of Florida in 2014
 Bob Langford, attorney
 John Joseph Mercadante, Republican National Committee official
 Bruce Nathan, physical therapist and candidate for the U.S. Senate in 2016
 Adam Putnam, Florida Commissioner of Agriculture and former U.S. representative
 Bob White, chairman of the Republican Liberty Caucus of Florida

Withdrawn 

 Issak Almaleh, notary
 Frederick Buntin, incarcerated felon
 Usha Jain, medical director
Jack Latvala, former Florida state senator
 Armando Adames Rivas, banker
 Angel Rivera, businessman, political strategist
 Nathan Dale Wilson

Declined

 Jeff Atwater, former Chief Financial Officer of Florida
 Pam Bondi, Florida Attorney General (endorsed Adam Putnam)
 Richard Corcoran, Speaker of the Florida House of Representatives (endorsed Adam Putnam)
 John Delaney, former mayor of Jacksonville
 Mike Huckabee, former governor of Arkansas and candidate for president in 2008 and in 2016
 Francis Rooney, U.S. representative
 Marco Rubio, U.S. senator from Florida and candidate for president in 2016
 Will Weatherford, former Speaker of the Florida House of Representatives

Endorsements

Polling

Results

Democratic primary

Nominee
 Andrew Gillum, mayor of Tallahassee

Eliminated in primary
 Gwen Graham, former U.S. representative and daughter of former U.S. senator and Governor Bob Graham
 Jeff Greene, real estate billionaire and candidate for the U.S. Senate in 2010
 Chris King, entrepreneur and founder of Elevation Financial Group
 Philip Levine, former mayor of Miami Beach
Alex Lundmark, real estate agent
John Wetherbee, entrepreneur

Withdrew
 Henry E. Davis, judge
 Richard Paul Dembinsky, candidate for U.S. representative in 2016 and candidate for governor in 2006
 Lucretia Fordyce, activist
 Josue Larose, perennial candidate
 Brooke Russell Locke Marx, notary
 Louis McClanahan, plant operator

Declined
 Bob Buckhorn, mayor of Tampa
 Kathy Castor, U.S. representative (running for reelection)
 Charlie Crist, U.S. representative, former governor of Florida, and nominee for governor in 2014 (running for reelection)
 Buddy Dyer, mayor of Orlando
 Rick Kriseman, mayor of St. Petersburg
 John Morgan, lawyer and medical marijuana advocate
 Patrick Murphy, former U.S. representative and nominee for the U.S. Senate in 2016
 Bill Nelson, U.S. senator (running for reelection)
 Jeremy Ring, former Florida state senator (running for CFO)
 Jack Seiler, mayor of Fort Lauderdale

Endorsements

Polling

Results

Independent and third party candidates

Reform Party

Declared 
Darcy Richardson, author and candidate for president in 2012

Libertarian Party

Withdrawn 
 Riquet Caballero, banker and Afro-Cuban activist (running for state representatives)
 Randy Wiseman, former chair of the Lake County School Board, candidate for state representative in 2004, and candidate for mayor of Mount Dora in 2013

Constitution party

Withdrawn 
 Daniel P. Zutler, businessman and candidate for president in 2016

Independents

Declared 

 Ryan Christopher Foley, former emergency medical technician
 Kyle "KC" Gibson, pastor
 Bruce Stanley, environmental activist

Declined 

 Grant Hill, former professional basketball player
 John Morgan, lawyer and medical marijuana advocate
 Ellen Marie Wilds, JPO supervisor (became Kyle "KC" Gibson's running mate)

Endorsements

General election

Debates

First debate 
The first debate moderated by CNN's Jake Tapper was hosted on October 21, 2018, at WEDU, Tampa, Florida. It was an hour long debate featuring topics like climate change, minimum wage, health care, gun control, the NRA, DeSantis's "monkey up" comment and President Donald Trump being a role model for children.

This debate was held a day before early voting started in Florida on October 22, 2018.

Second debate 
The second debate occurred on October 24, 2018, and was hosted at Weston, Florida. It was moderated by Leadership Florida and the Florida Press Association.

Endorsements

Predictions

Polling

with Ron DeSantis and Gwen Graham

with Ron DeSantis and Jeff Greene

with Ron DeSantis and Chris King

with Ron DeSantis and Philip Levine

with Adam Putnam and Andrew Gillum

with Adam Putnam and Gwen Graham

with Adam Putnam and Jeff Greene

with Adam Putnam and Chris King

with Adam Putnam and Philip Levine

with Bob White and Andrew Gillum

with Bob White and Gwen Graham

with Bob White and Chris King

with Bob White and Philip Levine

with generic Republican and Democrat

with Richard Corcoran and Andrew Gillum

with Richard Corcoran and Gwen Graham

with Richard Corcoran and Chris King

with Richard Corcoran and Philip Levine

with Richard Corcoran and John Morgan

with David Jolly and John Morgan

with Jeff Atwater and Gwen Graham

with Jeff Atwater and John Morgan

with Pam Bondi and Gwen Graham

with Pam Bondi and John Morgan

with David Jolly and Gwen Graham

with Andrew Putnam, Andrew Gillum, and John Morgan

with Andrew Putnam, Gwen Graham, and John Morgan

with Richard Corcoran, Andrew Gillum, and John Morgan

with Richard Corcoran, Gwen Graham, and John Morgan

with Adam Putnam and John Morgan

Results

Close margin
The close margin mandated a machine recount, which had a deadline of November 15, 2018. If the margin was below 0.25% after machine recount, Ken Detzner, the Secretary of State of Florida, would commission a manual recount of over-votes and under-votes. However, after the recount was complete, DeSantis' margin was 0.40%; therefore he was certified the winner. Gillum conceded on November 17.

In November 2022, Donald Trump stated that he had sent FBI agents to Florida to stop the 2018 election from being "stolen" from DeSantis, a claim that was met with skepticism.

Voter demographics

See also

 List of governors of Florida
 2018 United States gubernatorial elections

Notes

References

External links
Candidates at Vote Smart
Candidates at Ballotpedia

Official campaign websites
Ron DeSantis (R) for Governor
Andrew Gillum (D) for Governor
Darcy Richardson (Reform) for Governor
Bruce Stanley (No Party Affiliation) for Governor

2018
Florida
Gubernatorial
Ron DeSantis